The Hunt is a 2020 American horror thriller film directed by Craig Zobel and written by Nick Cuse and Damon Lindelof.  The film stars Betty Gilpin, Hilary Swank, Ike Barinholtz, and Emma Roberts. Jason Blum was a producer under his Blumhouse Productions banner, along with Lindelof. Zobel and Lindelof have said that the film is intended as a satire on the profound political divide between the American left and right. It is about a group of elites who kidnap working class people to hunt them.

The film was first announced in March 2018, and the cast signed on a year later. Filming took place in New Orleans. The film was originally scheduled for release on September 27, 2019. However, as a result of the Dayton and El Paso mass shootings in early August 2019, Universal Pictures decided to delay it.

The Hunt was released in theaters in the United States on March 13, 2020, by Universal Pictures and received mixed reviews from critics. The onset of the COVID-19 pandemic resulted in the closure of most theaters within a week of the film's release, which resulted in the film underperforming at the box office, grossing only $12.4 million. Universal made The Hunt available digitally on March 20.

Plot

In a group text, Athena Stone anticipates an upcoming hunt of "deplorables" at a manor ("Manorgate"). Later, on her private jet, she kills a man who staggers out from the cargo hold.

As the hunt begins, eleven captives wake up in a forest, with gags locked in their mouths. They find a cache of weapons and the keys to their gags in a clearing, but five of them are quickly killed by an unseen enemy. Three captives escape over a barbed-wire fence to a service station, whose owners Miranda and Julius ("Ma" and "Pop", respectively), identify their location as being in Arkansas. The three escapees, each kidnapped from a different part of the United States, realize their situation's similarity to the "Manorgate" conspiracy theory.

One of the three eats a poisoned donut and collapses, while Ma and Pop (who are two of the captors) kill a second with poison gas and the third with a blast from a sawed-off shotgun. They then clean up the station for the next person to come in. A fourth captive, Army veteran Crystal Creasey, arrives. After purchasing cigarettes from Ma and Pop and receives her change, she notes that the cigarettes are too expensive for the region. Crystal grabs the shotgun from under the counter and kills Ma and Pop with it.

Inspecting the pickup truck outside, Crystal learns her true location upon finding that its Arkansas license plate is a fake with a real Croatian one beneath. She also discovers a booby trap wired to the driver's-side door and warns another captive, a conspiracy theorist podcaster named Gary, not to take the truck. They board a train car full of refugees, whom Gary believes to be crisis actors; the train is then raided by Croatian soldiers. When Gary tries to convince the soldiers of Manorgate and the refugees' perfidy, a refugee, "Crisis Mike", admits to Gary that he is indeed one of the hunters but the other refugees are innocent. He reveals the raid was unplanned and offers a head start for Gary's cooperation. Gary takes a grenade from Mike and uses it to kill him. Crystal is then taken to a refugee camp where she meets Don, another escapee. Oliver, an envoy from the U.S. Embassy in Zagreb, arrives to take them to the embassy. During the drive, Oliver probes into why they were selected for the hunt, and lets out a Freudian slip, stating that they "must have been selected for a reason". Suspicious, Crystal kicks Oliver out of the car and runs him over.

She and Don find Gary's body in the trunk with a box marked "bribe money" and a map, and realize that Oliver was one of the hunters. Crystal tells Don the story of "the Jackrabbit and the Box Turtle", a version of "The Tortoise and the Hare" in which the Jackrabbit kills the Box Turtle after losing. At Oliver's intended destination, near the site of the captives' weapons cache, Crystal kills the hunters she finds and wounds their tactical consultant Sgt. Dale. Athena calls out to Don via radio, asking if he killed Crystal. When Don refuses to disarm and aims his gun at Crystal, she kills him. Crystal tortures the wounded Sgt. Dale to get Athena's location, then kills him. A flashback reveals that Athena's group text exchange was a joke. However, it was leaked on the internet, creating furor over "Manorgate". Subsequently, the group text's participants, whose careers were ruined, decide to make Manorgate a reality and abduct those responsible for spreading the conspiracy theory.

Athena had insisted that Crystal be included in the hunt after seeing a social media post from Crystal that offended her. When they confront each other, Crystal insists that Athena has confused her with another woman from the same city, with the same first name but a differently spelled middle name. It was also revealed that Crystal was nicknamed 'Snowball' by the hunters as a reference to the book Animal Farm. The two fight and impale one another on the blades of a food processor; Athena dies, but Crystal sees a jackrabbit near the body and regains some strength, remembering the story she told Don. She cauterizes her wound, takes Athena's clothes and bag, and leaves on her jet.

Cast

Production
In March 2018, Universal Pictures acquired the rights to the film, and set Craig Zobel to direct it, from a script by Nick Cuse and Damon Lindelof. The original title of the script was initially reported as Red State Vs. Blue State, a reference to the red states and blue states. Later, Universal issued a statement denying that the film had ever had it as its working title. The elite hunters' reference to their quarry as "deplorables" is an allusion to the phrase "basket of deplorables," used by Hillary Clinton during the 2016 United States presidential election campaign to refer to half of the supporters of then-presidential candidate Donald Trump. An early draft of the script depicted working class conservatives as the film's heroes.

In March 2019, Emma Roberts, Justin Hartley, Glenn Howerton, Ike Barinholtz, and Betty Gilpin were announced as being cast in the film. In April 2019, Amy Madigan, Jim Klock, Charli Slaughter, Steve Mokate, and Dean West were added as well. Hilary Swank's casting was announced in July. Filming began on February 20, 2019, in New Orleans, and was completed on April 5.

Nathan Barr composed the film score, replacing Heather McIntosh. Back Lot Music released the soundtrack.

Release
The Hunt was theatrically released in the United States on March 13, 2020, by Universal Pictures. It was originally scheduled for release on September 27, 2019. It was, for a time, moved back to October 18, 2019, before shifting back to September 27.  On August 7, 2019, Universal announced that in the wake of the Dayton and El Paso mass shootings, they would be suspending the film's promotional campaign. Several days later, the film was pulled from the studio's release schedule.

In February 2020, the studio announced that the film would be released on March 13, 2020 (Friday the 13th) in the U.S., with a new trailer, partially in response to the success of the similarly controversial film Joker. Producer Jason Blum stated in an interview that "not one frame was changed" since the delay and that it was "exactly the same movie".

In mid-March 2020, movie theaters began to close because of the COVID-19 pandemic lockdown measures. Three days after the film's release, on March 16, 2020, Universal Pictures announced that the film would be available digitally through Premium VOD in the United States and Canada on March 20, before the end of the usual 90-day theatrical run. This was also the case for the studio's other films such as The Invisible Man and Trolls World Tour.

The film was released in three Santikos Entertainment theater locations in San Antonio, Texas on May 1, 2020, after the chain reopened.

Reception

Initial reactions
The Hollywood Reporter wrote that there were a pair of test screenings for the film which garnered "negative reactions". The second screening was held on August 6, 2019, in Los Angeles, in which "audience members were again expressing discomfort with the politics" of it, an issue Universal had not foreseen (although other studios had initially passed on the script for that reason). In a statement to Variety, Universal pushed back on a report that test audiences had been uncomfortable with the film's political slant, and also countered claims that the script had originally had an explicitly political title.

The film's trailer received backlash by some in the conservative media for portraying supporters of Donald Trump being hunted by liberals. Trump also issued a tweet on August 9, 2019, criticizing the film industry while stating, "The movie coming out is made in order to inflame and cause chaos"; although Trump did not specify the name of the film, news outlets said it was most likely a reference to The Hunt. Kyle Smith, writing in the National Review, argued that the film would likely have a right-wing, anti-liberal tone that had been misinterpreted by conservative critics of the film's trailer.

In an interview with The Guardian, director Craig Zobel stated he didn't make the film in order to create controversy.

Box office
The Hunt grossed $5.8 million in the United States and Canada, and $36.9 million in other territories, for a worldwide total of $42.8 million.

In the United States and Canada, the film was released alongside Bloodshot and I Still Believe, and was projected to gross $8–11 million from 3,028 theaters in its opening weekend. The film made $2.2 million on its first day, including $435,000 from Thursday night previews. It went on to debut to $5.3 million, finishing fifth. The weekend was also noteworthy for being the lowest combined grossing since October 1998, with all films totaling just $55.3 million, in large part due to societal restrictions and regulations due to the COVID-19 pandemic. With the closure of many theaters due to COVID-19, the film played almost exclusively at drive-in theaters in the following weeks; it made $279,500 in its 11th weekend and $217,500 in its 12th weekend.

Critical response
On review aggregator Rotten Tomatoes, the film holds an approval rating of 57% based on 276 reviews, with an average rating of 5.9/10. The site's critics consensus read, "The Hunt is successful enough as a darkly humorous action thriller, but it shoots wide of the mark when it aims for timely social satire." On Metacritic, the film has a weighted average score of 50 out of 100, based on 45 critics, indicating "mixed or average reviews". Audiences polled by CinemaScore gave the film an average grade of "C+" on an A+ to F scale.

Accolades

Notes

References

External links

The Hunt Controversy

2019 controversies in the United States
2020 films
2020 action comedy films
2020 action thriller films
2020 horror thriller films
2020s political thriller films
American action comedy films
American action horror films
American action thriller films
American horror thriller films
American political thriller films
American satirical films
Blumhouse Productions films
Film controversies
American black comedy films
Film controversies in the United States
Political controversies in film
Films about death games
Films directed by Craig Zobel
Films produced by Jason Blum
Films shot in New Orleans
Films with screenplays by Damon Lindelof
Films scored by Nathan Barr
Universal Pictures films
2020s English-language films
2020s American films